Zhou Ning (born 2 April 1974) is a former Chinese footballer who played as a forward for the Chinese national football team.

Career statistics

Club

Notes

International

References

1974 births
Living people
Chinese footballers
Chinese expatriate footballers
China international footballers
Association football forwards
Beijing Guoan F.C. players
SV Waldhof Mannheim players
Chinese Super League players
Regionalliga players
2. Bundesliga players
Chinese expatriate sportspeople in Germany
Expatriate footballers in Germany